Novella is the seventh studio album by the English progressive rock band Renaissance, released in 1977. Bassist Jon Camp began working as a lyricist for this album, making it the first Renaissance album since Illusion (1971) to include songs written entirely by the band members themselves.

Background and recording
For Novella Renaissance returned to De Lane Lea Studios, where they had recorded Ashes Are Burning and Turn of the Cards, wanting to again work with the studio's engineer, Dick Plant. Though Renaissance are credited with producing the album by themselves, the band members have said that Plant essentially co-produced the album, as he did with Ashes Are Burning and Turn of the Cards.

With Novella bassist Jon Camp wrote lyrics for the group for the first time, usually with guitarist Michael Dunford collaborating with him on the music. Camp recalled, "Micky [Dunford] used to come along with the sort of main body of the song and then I used to go and stay at his house in Surrey. We'd spend 2-3 weeks together and then we’d extend the song, we'd write some music to go into it and then we'd take it to rehearsals ..."

The band had done virtually no pre-production or rehearsals of the material before entering the studio, or even worked out the arrangements. As a result, recording the album took two months.

To achieve the percussive effect on "Can You Hear Me?", drummer Terence Sullivan ran a gong through a flanger, while for "Midas Man" he shook a bag filled with coins. While recording "Touching Once (Is so Hard to Keep)", Richard Hewson, who handled the string arrangements for the album, suggested that a member of the orchestra perform a saxophone solo during the song; though Sullivan described the solo as "brilliant", the saxophonist was not credited for this contribution, and none of the members of Renaissance knew his name.

Release history and cover art 
Due to the bankruptcy of the band's UK label BTM, Renaissance had no UK record deal at the time Novella was completed. In the USA, however, they were still under contract to Sire Records, so Pamela Brown, an in-house artist for Sire, painted a cover for Novella, and the album was released in the USA in January 1977. At the time of this original issue, Sire was distributed in the USA by ABC Records.

Though Renaissance selected the design for the cover art from several sketches Brown showed them, they were dismayed when they saw the completed version, according to vocalist Annie Haslam, because "the woman on the cover looks like a nun, or someone symbolic of Mother Mary, which was very misleading." Meanwhile, getting a UK release for the album proved a struggle. CBS Records expressed interest, and even did test pressings of Novella, but ultimately Warner Bros. Records were the label to sign the band. With the UK release not arriving until September, a number of UK fans imported copies of the USA release. Renaissance still wanted the cover art altered to eliminate the nun resemblance, and persuaded Warner Bros. that producing an alternate cover for the UK release could help offset the loss of sales to fans importing the USA version. Accordingly, the UK version used new cover art, again painted by Pamela Brown and still using the same design sketch, but addressing Renaissance's complaints with the original version. Shortly thereafter, Sire changed distribution in the USA to Warner Bros. Records, and the cover artwork was revised to use the same painting as that employed in its UK issue. The 2nd USA issue can most easily be identified by the rendering of the band which takes up the entire back cover; the original ABC-distributed cover features a much smaller painting of the band on the back.

In the USA the album was initially released with unique cover art by Sire Records in March 1977 under its distribution deal with ABC Records, and was assigned the catalog number SA-7526. It was subsequently re-released with revised cover artwork with the catalog number SR-6024 after Sire moved its distribution to Warner. In the UK it was given a scheduled release in the same month by CBS with the catalog number S CBS 82137 and although some test pressings were made, the release did not go ahead. The album was eventually released by Warner Bros. in the UK on 2 September 1977 with the catalog number K 56422. It was also released in Japan in 1978 on the Warner Brothers / Pioneer label, catalog number WB P10492W.

The album charted at No. 46 in the Billboard 200 chart in the USA.

The song "Can You Hear Me?" was sampled in the Deep Puddle Dynamics' We Ain't Fessin' (Double Quotes), and Blockheads' Music by Cavelight track "Sunday Seance".

Esoteric Recordings released a re-mastered, three CD expanded edition of the album on 5 July 2019.

Track listing

Expanded edition

Personnel

Renaissance
 Annie Haslam – lead and backing vocals
 Michael Dunford – acoustic guitars, backing vocals
 John Tout – piano, analogue synthesizers, Hohner D6 clavinet
 Jon Camp – bass, acoustic guitars, co-lead vocals on "The Captive Heart", backing vocals, Moog bass pedals, cello on "The Sisters" 
 Terence Sullivan – drums, percussion, backing vocals

Additional musicians
Richard Hewson - orchestral arrangements & conductor
uncredited - saxophone solo on "Touching Once"

Production
Dick Plant - engineer, co-producer [uncredited]
Barry Kidd - assistant engineer

Notes

References 

Renaissance (band) albums
1977 albums
Warner Records albums
Sire Records albums